Peter Hanslow Cleal (6 April 1903 – 7 March 1979) was an Australian rules footballer who played with St Kilda in the Victorian Football League (VFL).

Notes

External links 

1903 births
1979 deaths
Australian rules footballers from Melbourne
St Kilda Football Club players
People from Clifton Hill, Victoria